Ricky Pratama (born 6 May 2003) is an Indonesian professional footballer who plays as a forward for Liga 1 club PSM Makassar and the Indonesia national under-20 team.

Club career

PSM Makassar
He was signed for PSM Makassar to play in Liga 1 in the 2022 season. Ricky made his league debut on 10 September 2022 in a match against Persebaya Surabaya  at the Gelora B.J. Habibie Stadium, Parepare.

International career
On 2 June 2022, Ricky made his debut for an Indonesian youth team U-20 against a Ghana U-20 squad in the 2022 Maurice Revello Tournament in France. In October 2022, it was reported that Ricky received a call-up from the Indonesia U-20 for a training camp, in Turkey and Spain.

Career statistics

Club

Notes

Honours

Individual
 Liga 1 U-18 Top Goalscorer: 2021 (27 goals)

References

External links
 Ricky Pratama at Soccerway
 Ricky Pratama at Liga Indonesia

2003 births
Living people
Indonesian footballers
PSM Makassar players
Liga 1 (Indonesia) players
People from Sidoarjo Regency
Sportspeople from East Java
Association football forwards